The Sensual World is the sixth studio album by the English art rock singer Kate Bush, released on 16 October 1989 by EMI Records. It reached No. 2 on the UK Albums Chart. It has been certified Platinum by the British Phonographic Industry (BPI) for shipments in excess of 300,000 in the United Kingdom, and Gold by the Recording Industry Association of America (RIAA) in the United States.

Overview
Bush drew inspiration for the title track from the modernist novel Ulysses by James Joyce. Bush realised that Molly Bloom's soliloquy, the closing passage of the novel, fitted the music she had created. When the Joyce estate refused to release the text, Bush wrote original lyrics that echo the original passage, as Molly steps from the pages of the book and revels in the real world. She also alluded to "Jerusalem" by William Blake in a reference to the song's gestation ("And my arrows of desire rewrite the speech"). The song includes Irish instrumentation (uilleann pipes, fiddle, whistle) under a breathy rendering of the orgasmic 'Yes' of the original text.

The songs "Deeper Understanding", "Never Be Mine", and "Rocket's Tail" all feature backing vocals by the Bulgarian vocal ensemble Trio Bulgarka. "Heads We're Dancing" includes a characteristic Mick Karn fretless bassline. The song "This Woman's Work" from the romantic comedy film She's Having a Baby (1988) was re-edited for this album. On 27 November 2005 it was featured in the British TV drama Walk Away and I Stumble starring Tamzin Outhwaite. Due to that broadcast, the song reached No. 3 on the UK Singles Downloads Chart in late 2005. This song has also been used in a long-running UK television advert for the National Society for the Prevention of Cruelty to Children, broadcast between 2005 and 2008, and in the Extras Christmas Special in 2007. A version of the song was recorded by R&B artist Maxwell in 1997 for his MTV Unplugged EP.

Released as CD players were becoming increasingly popular, the original LP ended with "This Woman's Work", whilst "Walk Straight Down the Middle" was included as a bonus track on the CD and cassette versions of the album. The gap between these two tracks is slightly longer to indicate the album was intended to finish with "This Woman's Work". "Walk Straight Down the Middle" later appeared on the compilation The Other Sides.

A video collection called The Sensual World: The Videos was also released. It contained videos for the title song, "Love and Anger", and "This Woman's Work" (all directed by Bush herself), as well as excerpts from an interview Bush gave to the music TV channel VH1.

In May 2011, Bush released the album Director's Cut, which featured new versions of four songs from The Sensual World, including the title song, now called "Flower of the Mountain". Finally having received permission from the Joyce estate, Bush recorded a new vocal using Molly Bloom's soliloquy as the lyric. Additionally, she re-recorded a sparse, piano-only version of "This Woman's Work". The new version of "Deeper Understanding" was released as a single, with an accompanying video.

The live version of "Never Be Mine" was included on her live album Before the Dawn, released in 2016. Although the song had not been performed before an audience, Bush included the live version in the recording.

Critical reception

"While Bush's famously fey voice would probably be enough to hold the disparate strands of The Sensual World together, the album takes its cue and colouring too from the hypnotically sinuous sway of the pipes on the title track," wrote Robert Sandall in Q. "There are some strapping power chords to be despatched here and there, most notably on Love And Anger, but the dominant mood is of Oriental reverie, similar in feel to that achieved latterly by Japan. And in fact the last track on side one, Heads We're Dancing, reproduces that mysteriously sproingy bass sound favoured by Mick Karn."

In 1990, Bush received two nominations at the 10th Brit Awards in the categories Best British Producer and Best British Female. At the 33rd Grammy Awards held the following year, The Sensual World was nominated for Best Alternative Music Performance.

Slant Magazine ranked The Sensual World at No. 55 on its 2012 list of the best albums of the 1980s, writing, "Blessed with one of music's most wildly expressive voices, Bush takes each song further than she has to, resulting in an album that forms its own unique world."

Track listing

Personnel
Credits are adapted from The Sensual World liner notes.
Kate Bush – vocals; piano; keyboards
Del Palmer – Fairlight CMI percussion; bass guitar (1, 4, 7); rhythm guitar and percussion (5)
Charlie Morgan – drums (1, 4, 6, 11)
Stuart Elliott – drums (2, 3, 5, 7, 8, 9)
Bill Whelan – arranger ("The Irish sessions")
Paddy Bush – whip (swished fishing rod) (1), valiha and backing vocals (2), mandolin (4), tupan (6)
Davy Spillane – uilleann pipes (1, 8), whistle (3)
John Sheahan – fiddle (1)
Dónal Lunny – bouzouki (1)
John Giblin – bass guitar (2, 6, 9)
David Gilmour – guitar (2, 9)
Alan Murphy – guitar; guitar synthesizer (3, 5, 7)
Jonathan Williams – cello (3, 5, 7)
Nigel Kennedy – violin (3); viola (5)
Michael Kamen – orchestral arrangements (3, 5, 10)
Alan Stivell – Celtic harp (3, 7); backing vocals (7)
"Dr. Bush" (Robert Bush, Kate's father) – dialogue (3)
Balanescu Quartet – strings (4)
Michael Nyman – string arrangement (Balanescu Quartet)
Mick Karn – bass guitar (5)
Trio Bulgarka – vocals (6, 8, 9)
Yanka Rupkina (of Trio Bulgarka) – solo vocalist (6, 9)
Dimitar Penev – arranger (Trio Bulgarka)
Eberhard Weber – double bass (8, 11)

Production
Kate Bush – producer
Del Palmer – recording engineer, mixing (11)
Haydn Bendall, Kevin Killen, Paul Gomazel – additional recording engineers
Tom Leader – assistant engineer (Trio Bulgarka sessions)
Andrew Boland – engineer ("The Irish sessions")
John Grimes – assistant engineer ("The Irish sessions")
Kevin Killen – mixing (1–10)
Ian Cooper – mastering

Charts

Weekly charts

Year-end charts

Certifications and sales

The Sensual World: The Videos

Track listing
 "Interview" – 0:36
 "The Sensual World" – 5:15
 "Love and Anger" – 4:43
 "This Woman's Work" – 6:31

References

External links
 

1989 albums
EMI Records albums
Kate Bush albums
Progressive pop albums